ALS Lissus is an Iliria-class patrol vessel of the Albanian Coast Guard. She is the third ship of her class, behind her sister ships Iliria and Oriku. Lisus was built in Albania in cooperation with the Netherlands. She has taken part in joint operations and exercises alongside NATO ships, showing the Albanian flag in international waters.

References

Iliria-class patrol vessels
2012 ships
Ships built in Albania